The Yellow Rose society (Swedish: Gula Rosen) was the name of a Swedish Masonic adoption lodge within the Freemasons, active from 1802 until 1803. It was founded by Karl Adolf Boheman upon the mutual wish of the royal couple Duke Charles and Duchess Charlotte of Sudermannia, and open to both sexes. It was closed by King Gustav IV Adolf of Sweden and the cause of the so-called Boheman Affair, which caused a conflict between the monarch and his uncle and aunt.

References

 Kjell Lekeby (2010). Gustaviansk mystik. Alkemister, kabbalister, magiker, andeskådare, astrologer och skattgrävare i den esoteriska kretsen kring G.A. Reuterholm, hertig Carl och hertiginnan Charlotta 1776-1803.. Sala Södermalm: Vertigo Förlag. 

1802 in Sweden
1803 in Sweden
Freemasonry